The 2016 Austrian Athletics Championships was the year's national championship in outdoor track and field for Austria. It was held on 30 and 31 July at the Universitäts- und Landessportzentrum Salzburg Rif in Rif, Hallein. It served as the selection meeting for Austria at the 2016 Summer Olympics.

Results

Men

Women

References 

Results
 Ausschreibung
 Vorschau: Österreichische Staatsmeisterschaften als letzter Olympiatest
 Österreichische Staatsmeisterschaften in Rif - 1. Tag
 Österreichische Staatsmeisterschaften in Rif - 2. Tag
 Universitäts- und Landessportzentrum Salzburg/Rif
 Ergebnisübersicht
 Österr. Staatsmeisterschaften Rif 30.07.2016 – 31.07.2016 – Verfügbare Disziplinen

External links 
 Official website of the Austrian Athletics Federation 

2016
Austrian Athletics Championships
Austrian Championships
Athletics Championships
Sport in Salzburg (state)
Hallein